The Buffalo and Fort Erie Public Bridge Authority (also known as the Peace Bridge Authority and the Public Bridge Authority) is the agency established to regulate the Peace Bridge, which crosses the Canada–United States border. This bridge is designed to handle vehicle traffic between Buffalo in the American state of New York and Fort Erie in the Canadian province of Ontario.

The authority is a bi-national agency, incorporated as both a Class D public benefit corporation in the State of New York and a Crown corporation federally in Canada, governed under the terms of an agreement between New York and the Canadian federal government.

Board of directors

The Bridge Authority is led by a ten-member board, five from each country. The chairmanship alternates annually between a Canadian representative and an American representative.

Two of the five US members are appointed by the Governor of New York with confirmation by the New York State Senate. The remaining members are the Commissioner of the New York State Department of Transportation, Chairman of the Niagara Frontier Transportation Authority, and the Attorney General of New York (or their delegates).

All five of the Canadian members are appointed by the Governor-in-Council as per recommendation by the federal Minister of Transport.

See also
 Detroit International Bridge Company - private, Ambassador Bridge
 Niagara Falls Bridge Commission - public, Lewiston-Queenston Bridge, Whirlpool Rapids Bridge and Rainbow Bridge
 Ogdensburg Bridge and Port Authority - public
 Port Authority of New York and New Jersey - public
 Sault Ste. Marie Bridge Company - private, railway bridge
 Thousand Islands Bridge Authority - public, Thousand Islands Bridge
 Windsor-Detroit Bridge Authority - public, Gordie Howe International Bridge

References 

Federal departments and agencies of Canada
Public benefit corporations in New York (state)
Transport in the Regional Municipality of Niagara
Transportation in Buffalo, New York
Canada–United States border
Canadian federal Crown corporations
1923 establishments in New York (state)
1923 establishments in Canada